The following are lists of current and former Hospitals in the Canadian province of New Brunswick.  All Hospitals in New Brunswick use Ambulance New Brunswick and are provincially run by Department of Health.

Current Hospital List

Former Hospital List

See also
 List of hospitals in Canada
Government of New Brunswick - List of regional services by Health Region

References

New Brunswick
Hospitals